The Georgia Dome was a domed stadium in the Southeastern United States.  Located in Atlanta between downtown to the east and Vine City to the west, it was owned and operated by the State of Georgia as part of the Georgia World Congress Center Authority. Its successor, Mercedes-Benz Stadium, was built adjacent to the south and opened on August 26, 2017. The Georgia Dome was demolished on November 20, 2017.

The Georgia Dome was the home stadium for the Atlanta Falcons of the National Football League (NFL) and the Georgia State University Panthers football team. It hosted two Super Bowls (XXVIII and XXXIV), 25 editions of the Peach Bowl (January 1993–December 2016) and 23 SEC Championship Games (1994−2016). In addition, the Georgia Dome also hosted several soccer matches since 2009 with attendances over 50,000. In its 25 years of operation, the Georgia Dome hosted over 1,400 events attended by over 37 million people. The Georgia Dome was the only stadium in the United States to host the Olympics, Super Bowl and Final Four.

At its debut in 1992, the Georgia Dome was the second-largest covered stadium in the world by capacity, behind the Pontiac Silverdome; it was also surpassed by AT&T Stadium in Arlington, Texas, and Millennium Stadium in Cardiff, Wales.

History

Facility information
The Georgia Dome was completed in 1992 at a cost of $214 million, making it one of the largest state-funded construction projects in Georgia history. The stadium seated 71,228 for football, approximately 80,000 for concerts, and 71,000 for basketball when the stadium fully opened and 40,000 for basketball and gymnastics when the stadium was sectioned off (one half closed off by a large curtain). For most Georgia State football games, the dome was configured with 28,155 seats, with tickets for only the bulk of the lower level and the club-level seats on sale. The record for overall attendance at the Georgia Dome came during a college football game, with 80,892 at the SEC Championship Game in 2008.

The Dome had 5,740 club seats and 171 luxury boxes. The executives suites fit 16-24 people, while eight super-suites added in 2007 were capable of accommodating 57-96 guests. There were also four restaurants/bars. There were 12 escalators and 9 elevators.

The stadium was the largest cable-supported dome in the world. From its completion until the December 31, 1999 opening of the  Millennium Dome in London, it was the largest hooked domed structure of any type in the world. Matt Hartley Lighting, LLC designed the lighting for the concourse of the Georgia Dome.

Surface
The Georgia Dome originally used AstroTurf artificial surface for its football events. In 2003, Arthur Blank, the new owner of Atlanta Falcons, funded the installation of the new infilled FieldTurf artificial surface system.

Renovations
In 2006, the Atlanta Falcons and the Georgia World Congress Center Authority announced a $300 million renovation to the Georgia Dome. The project was separated into two stages. The first stage, which took place before the 2007 NFL season, focused on updating the premium seating areas, including the creation of eight 'super-suites' as well as an owners' club, most of them now incorporating new plasma TVs. In 2008, the exterior of the stadium was repainted, replacing the original teal and maroon color scheme with a red, black, and silver theme to match the Falcons' team colors; the stadium's original teal seats were replaced with red seats in the lower and upper levels and black seats in the middle level. The entrance gates and concourses were also renovated and updated before the 2008 football season. In 2009, the video screens in both end zones were relocated to a new exterior monument sign on Northside Drive. The interior end zones each received a new and considerably wider HD video screen that significantly enhanced views of replays, as well as graphics and digital presentations. A new sound system was installed in the same year, replacing the previous system that was nearly 20 years old.

In 2008, the Georgia Dome started showing safety videos before games, presented by Deltalina, flight attendant "mascot" of Delta Air Lines. The videos satirize Delta's massively popular "Deltalina" inflight safety videos. The videos' theme was "Delta Safety First".

Major weather-related issues
Three years after the completion of the Dome, the integrity of its roof became an issue. During a Falcons pre-season game in August 1995, a severe rainstorm caused water to pool on the fabric, tearing part of the material, and causing a section of the roof to fall into the stadium. The storm was intense enough that the roof panels could be seen moving during the game, and the water and roof material later fell with enough force to smash seats in the upper decks and knock holes in concrete floors. The collapse occurred after fans left the stadium, and no one was injured during the incident. The roof was eventually repaired in a way that prevented similar incidents from occurring in the future.

In the 2008 Atlanta tornado outbreak on March 14, 2008, during the 2008 SEC men's basketball tournament, a tornado ripped two holes in the dome during the Alabama–Mississippi State quarterfinal game, delaying the game for about an hour. The quarterfinal game to follow between the Kentucky Wildcats and Georgia Bulldogs was postponed until the following day. The resulting damage forced the rest of the tournament to be moved to the Alexander Memorial Coliseum, now known as McCamish Pavilion, at Georgia Tech.<ref
name="ajctornado">Tornado Kills, 2 Pummels Downtown by Tim Eberly and Paul Shea for The Atlanta Journal-Constitution, March 15, 2008. Retrieved March 15, 2008.</ref>

Final years and replacement

In 2010, the Georgia World Congress Center Authority announced plans for a new stadium just south of the Georgia Dome. At the time, the Georgia Dome had just completed a major update and was still relatively young. The Dome had been designed specifically for football while a handful of NFL teams still made do with multi-purpose stadiums shared with MLB teams; plus, the Dome had plenty of luxury suites and premium seating which were important revenue-generating features lacking other older venues which made them obsolete. Lastly, the new stadium was located directly adjacent to the Georgia Dome (in contrast to older multi-purpose stadiums, whose suburban locale did not match up with a team's fanbase). Nonetheless, sports economist Rod Fort noted that pro sports team owners "thought they could get away with demanding new" stadiums every year with public money; plus, the Falcons did not have control of the Dome nor the profits, which made them less competitive than other teams that owned state-of-the-art facilities. In addition, Arthur Blank "wanted a state-of-the-art facility for his NFL and MLS teams and was willing to pitch in a huge amount of money to make it happen", as well as wanting to host another Super Bowl. Also with the Atlanta climate the Falcons long desired to play outdoors in either an open-air stadium or retractable roof stadium rather than inside a dome. At the time it was planned to retain the Georgia Dome to continue hosting non-NFL events.

In justifying the need for a new venue, Falcons CEO and president Rich McKay said that the Georgia Dome “was a really functional building that served its purpose very well. We did not want to build a better Georgia Dome. That was not the object. If we would have done that, we would have renovated the Georgia Dome. We really wanted to change the game and do it for a long, long time.” Stadium general manager Scott Jenkins described the new stadium's advantages over the Dome, saying "The LED displays we have, whether it’s every seat is two-inches wider than the Georgia Dome, almost all the concourses connect so you can circumnavigate the building, you don’t get cut-off. You can move vertically throughout the building, we have really wide staircases, we have twice the elevators, twice the escalators compared to the Georgia Dome". McKay said of it, "The architecture, I think, speaks for itself. I hope the first time you're in it, yeah, you're wowed by the architecture, but more wowed by the fan experience." SB Nation noted that while the "Georgia Dome did its job for 24 years...it wasn’t anything special. That’s not the case with [the Mercedes-Benz Stadium]. Walking up to it feels like you’re approaching a darn spaceship".

The new stadium, which would be known as Mercedes-Benz Stadium, received approval from the city of Atlanta, Fulton County, and Georgia state governments in 2013. Construction commenced and ground was broken in 2014.

The Falcons' final game in the Dome was the 2016 NFC Championship Game on January 22, 2017, with a 44–21 victory over the Green Bay Packers, that sent the Falcons to their second Super Bowl appearance in franchise history. The stadium's final public event took place on March 4 and 5, 2017 with back-to-back Monster Jam shows.

Demolition
Shortly after the Georgia Dome's closing, a group presented a petition to the governor's office to save the stadium from demolition, arguing that it was still in good condition and that its loss would be wasteful. While the Falcons initially sought an open-air stadium to complement the Georgia Dome, GWCCA officials ultimately concluded that maintaining two 70,000-seat stadiums was not financially feasible, and the Georgia Dome's fate was already sealed when Mercedes-Benz Stadium was approved in 2013.

Demolition of the Georgia Dome was intended to begin shortly after the stadium's final event; however, due to construction delays caused by the complexity of Mercedes-Benz Stadium's eight-panel retractable roof, demolition of the Georgia Dome was postponed until the new stadium's certificate of occupancy could be issued. GWCCA officials stated that the Georgia Dome would remain nominally operational until Mercedes-Benz Stadium was ready; however, the Dome's artificial turf had been removed and its offices vacated prior to the announcement of the new stadium's delay.

On June 9, 2017, Steve Cannon, CEO of the Falcons' parent company AMB Group, stated that construction officials were confident that Mercedes-Benz Stadium would be ready in time for the Falcons' first preseason game, and the process of decommissioning the Georgia Dome had resumed, with the Dome scheduled for implosion on November 20, 2017 at 7:30 am EST.

In July 2017, GWCCA officials removed equipment they intend to reuse either at Mercedes-Benz Stadium or elsewhere on the GWCC campus while other equipment was liquidated by sealed bids. Most of the seats in the lower and middle bowls were sold in bulk to high schools and colleges while pairs were sold to individuals; most of the upper bowl seats were recycled. The stadium's lower bowl and loading docks were demolished by mid-August. From September 16 to 30, 2017, memorabilia from the Georgia Dome was sold in an online auction format by Schneider Industries.

To ensure that the roof fell in place during the implosion, parts of the concrete ring supporting the roof had been chipped away and ventilation holes were cut into the roof fabric.  of explosives were used to bring the Dome down within 12 seconds.

Due to the large exclusion zone required for the demolition, no public viewing areas were made available; additionally, Metropolitan Atlanta Rapid Transit Authority officials announced that rail service west of the Five Points station would be suspended on the day of demolition until MARTA safety inspectors certified that the tunnels which run below the Dome site were safe for trains to operate. GWCCA officials stated that the implosion would be broadcast live by WSB-TV as well as livestreamed on the official websites of the Falcons, Atlanta United FC, and Mercedes-Benz Stadium. Live coverage of the implosion on the Weather Channel was blocked at the last moment by a MARTA bus that stopped in front of the camera just seconds before the implosion.

While the implosion was considered successful with the roof and a majority of the structure felled, the eastern wall and the northwest gate of the Dome were left standing after the implosion. The Georgia World Congress Center and Mercedes-Benz Stadium were undamaged during the first implosion, although the new stadium did receive a heavy dusting. Initially, demolition officials stated that the two remaining sections would be brought down manually with hydraulic excavators; however, after inspections determined that the explosive charges did not detonate, a supplementary implosion took place on the morning of December 20 at 1:00 am EST. A window at one of the GWCC buildings was shattered during the second implosion but was quickly replaced.

Following the implosion, most of the concrete from the Georgia Dome remained on site, crushed into smaller pieces to be used as infill material while steel and other materials were separated and recycled. Most of the Georgia Dome site became greenspace for tailgating at Mercedes-Benz Stadium and other community events. On April 21, 2017, GWCCA officials announced that The Home Depot acquired the naming rights to the  park prior to its construction, adopting the name of "The Home Depot Backyard". Cleanup of debris from the Georgia Dome site was completed by late February 2018 with construction of the Home Depot Backyard beginning shortly thereafter; the new park officially opened on September 11, 2018. Ground was broken for a new high-rise convention center hotel on May 19, 2021; the new hotel will be located between the Home Depot Backyard and GWCC Building C, and will be the first newly-constructed hotel for Hilton's Signia brand. The new hotel is projected to open in January 2024.

A historical marker erected by the GWCCA and the Georgia Historical Society commemorating the Georgia Dome's legacy was dedicated on September 6, 2018.

Events hosted

Football

The Dome was home to the NFL's Atlanta Falcons. The stadium also hosted Super Bowl XXVIII in 1994 and Super Bowl XXXIV in 2000. The Falcons didn't qualify for the playoffs both times that the Dome hosted the Super Bowl; despite a 14-2 regular season in 1998 which was capped off with a Super Bowl appearance, the Falcons slumped to a 5-11 record in 1999.  The final NFL Game at the Georgia Dome was the 2016 NFC Championship between the Falcons and the Green Bay Packers, with the Falcons winning 44-21 to advance to their second Super Bowl in franchise history.

The Dome was also the annual host (since 1998) to FCS Classic football game between Florida A&M Rattlers and another HBCU opponent (Southern Jaguars in 2011 and Tennessee State Tigers in prior years), and the annual host to the Southeastern Conference Football Championship Game and the Chick-fil-A Bowl (also known as the Peach Bowl) post-season college football games. From 2015 to 2016, the Dome hosted the Celebration Bowl, the annual post-season bowl match up between the MEAC and SWAC. On January 2, 2006 the Georgia Dome hosted the Nokia Sugar Bowl, between the University of Georgia and West Virginia University. The game was held in Atlanta, Georgia, since the game's usual venue, the Louisiana Superdome, was unable host due to damage caused by Hurricane Katrina.

From the program's inception in 2010 until 2016, the stadium was home of the NCAA Division I Georgia State Panthers of Georgia State University. Subsequently, with the Dome's impending closure, the university acquired the Atlanta Braves' former Turner Field baseball park and renovated it to Georgia State Stadium for college football. 

The Georgia Dome also annually hosted the Georgia High School Association (GHSA) football semi-finals until 2007 and hosted the football state championships from 2008 to 2016.

Basketball
The Georgia Dome hosted the NCAA Final Four Men's Basketball National Championship in 2002, 2007, and 2013, along with regional semi-finals and finals in 2001, 2004, 2006 and 2012 and NCAA Women's Final Four in 2003. The SEC men's basketball tournament has been held at the Georgia Dome during 10 seasons, most recently in 2014. The ACC men's basketball tournament has been held at the Georgia Dome on two occasions, in 2001 and 2009.  The NCAA Division I Basketball's Champions Classic was held at the dome in 2012.

It was also one of two homes, along with the facility then known as Alexander Memorial Coliseum, for the NBA's Atlanta Hawks during the construction of State Farm Arena from 1997 to 1999 on the site of the former Omni Coliseum. While playing at the Georgia Dome on March 27, 1998, the Atlanta Hawks set a then-NBA single-game attendance record with 62,046 fans against Michael Jordan and the Chicago Bulls.

Olympics
For the 1996 Summer Olympics, one half of the arena hosted the basketball competitions (including final) while the other half hosted the artistic gymnastics events and team handball (men's final).

Soccer
The Georgia Dome held a number of international soccer matches. On June 24, 2009, the Dome hosted its first ever soccer match between Mexico and Venezuela in front of 51,115 fans, with grass laid over the FieldTurf. On February 9, 2011, Mexico and Bosnia and Herzegovina played a friendly match in front of 50,507 fans. On July 20, 2013, the Dome hosted two quarter-final match-ups of the 2013 Gold Cup—Panama vs. Cuba and Mexico vs. Trinidad & Tobago—in front of 54,229 fans.

The stadium was an official candidate venue for hosting matches as part of the United States' bid for the 2022 FIFA World Cup, but Qatar was selected to host the tournament.

Drum Corps International

The stadium also hosted the Drum Corps International (DCI) Southeastern Championship from 2006-2016. The inaugural event featured 22 drum corps in the old fashioned Prelims/Finals one-day format. During the competition, the stadium was the first, and only indoor rain delay, when an upper deck rain gutter leaked inside the stadium. The 2006 competition was won by The Cavaliers, becoming the first of only four corps to win in the 11 years the stadium hosted the event.

From 2007-2014, the Blue Devils would win an unprecedented 8 straight victories at the annual Southeastern Championship. The win streak would be snapped in 2015 by Carolina Crown with its fan-favorite production of "Inferno"

With the announcement of the Mercedes-Benz Stadium to be opened in the summer of 2017, the 2016 tour season would be the last hurrah inside the dome. Though the 2016 season would be the last in the dome, it would prove to be a historical one at that, with the Bluecoats powering their way to the top to win the last competition in the stadium, bringing the corps' first Southeast Championship and later on their first DCI World Championship Title.

While the 2017 show was scheduled to be in the new Mercedes-Benz Stadium, construction delays would make the venue not ready for the July 29 event, which would find a temporary home at McEachern High School in Powder Springs. DCI aims to host the 2018 Southeastern Championship in the new stadium.

Wrestling
The Georgia Dome hosted WrestleMania XXVII on April 3, 2011 as well as WrestleMania Axxess in the Georgia World Congress Center; WrestleMania XXVII was the last WWE event held in the Georgia Dome.

WCW Monday Nitro was hosted in the Georgia Dome twice in 1998 and twice again in 1999; WWE Monday Night Raw was hosted 4 times in the stadium between 1999 and 2001.

See also

 Tension fabric building
 Tensile structure

References

External links

 The Georgia Dome's Official Website
 Georgia Dome at StadiumDB.com
 

1992 establishments in Georgia (U.S. state)
2017 disestablishments in Georgia (U.S. state)
Defunct sports venues in Georgia (U.S. state)
Demolished sports venues in Georgia (U.S. state)
Demolished buildings and structures in Atlanta
Buildings and structures demolished by controlled implosion
Covered stadiums in the United States
Defunct NCAA bowl game venues
Defunct National Football League venues
American football venues in Atlanta
Basketball venues in Georgia (U.S. state)
Atlanta Hawks venues
Atlanta Falcons stadiums
Georgia State Panthers football
SEC Championship Game
Former National Basketball Association venues
Lattice shell structures
Tensile membrane structures
Venues of the 1996 Summer Olympics
Handball venues in the United States
Olympic basketball venues
Olympic gymnastics venues
Olympic handball venues
CONCACAF Gold Cup stadiums
Sports venues completed in 1992
Sports venues demolished in 2017
NCAA Division I men's basketball tournament Final Four venues